The 2020 Dixie Vodka 400 was a NASCAR Cup Series race that was originally scheduled to be held on March 22, 2020 and was rescheduled to June 14, 2020, at Homestead–Miami Speedway in Homestead, Florida. On March 13, 2020, NASCAR announced that they would postpone the race due to the COVID-19 pandemic.

Contested over 267 laps on the 1.5 mile (2.4 km) oval, it was 12th race of the 2020 NASCAR Cup Series season. This race will be the first time since 2001 that Homestead has not hosted the final race of the season, and the first time in the Chase/Playoff era.

Report

Background

Homestead-Miami Speedway is a motor racing track located in Homestead, Florida. The track, which has several configurations, has promoted several series of racing, including NASCAR, the NTT IndyCar Series and the Grand-Am Rolex Sports Car Series

From 2002 to 2019, Homestead-Miami Speedway has hosted the final race of the season in all three of NASCAR's series: the NASCAR Cup Series, Xfinity Series and Gander RV & Outdoors Truck Series.

After having held races closed to spectators since The Real Heroes 400 in May due to the pandemic, the Dixie Vodka 400 was the first NASCAR event to admit a limited number of outside spectators (albeit still closed to the public). The race was held before an audience of 1,000 United States Armed Forces members from South Florida, representing the Homestead Air Reserve Base and the United States Southern Command.

Entry list
 (R) denotes rookie driver.
 (i) denotes driver who are ineligible for series driver points.

Qualifying
Denny Hamlin was awarded the pole for the race as determined by a random draw.

Starting Lineup

Race

Stage Results

Stage One
Laps: 80

Stage Two
Laps: 80

Final Stage Results

Stage Three
Laps: 107

Race statistics
 Lead changes: 18 among 7 different drivers
 Cautions/Laps: 6 for 27
 Red flags: 2 for 2 hours, 46 minutes and 48 seconds
 Time of race: 3 hours, 8 minutes and 6 seconds
 Average speed:

Media

Television
The Dixie Vodka 400 will be carried by Fox in the United States. Mike Joy and 2012 Homestead winner Jeff Gordon will cover the race from the Fox Sports studio in Charlotte. Matt Yocum handled the pit road duties. Larry McReynolds provided insight from the Fox Sports studio in Charlotte.

Radio
MRN will have the radio call for the race, which will be simulcast on Sirius XM NASCAR Radio. Alex Hayden and Jeff Striegle will call the action of the race for MRN when the field raced down the front straightaway. Dave Moody will cover the action for MRN in turns 1 & 2, and Mike Bagley will have the call of the action from turns 3 & 4. Winston Kelley and Steve Post will cover the action of the race for MRN on pit road.

Standings after the race

Drivers' Championship standings

Manufacturers' Championship standings

Note: Only the first 16 positions are included for the driver standings.
. – Driver has clinched a position in the NASCAR Cup Series playoffs.

References

Dixie Vodka 400
Dixie Vodka 400
Dixie Vodka 400
NASCAR races at Homestead-Miami Speedway